The 2014 Tour de Langkawi was the 19th edition of an annual professional road bicycle racing stage race held in Malaysia since 1996. The race was run at the highest category (apart from those races which make up the UCI World Tour, and was rated by the Union Cycliste Internationale (UCI) as a 2.HC (hors category) race as part of the UCI Asia Tour.

Teams
21 teams accepted invitations to participate in the 2013 Tour de Langkawi. Six UCI ProTeams were invited to the race, along with five UCI Professional Continental and seven UCI Continental teams. The field was completed by three national selection teams.
UCI ProTour teams

 
 
 
 
 
 

UCI Professional Continental teams

 
 
 
 
 

UCI Continental teams

 
 
 Giant-Champion System Pro
 OCBC Singapore Continental Cycling Team
 
 
 

National teams

 Indonesia
 Malaysia
 Hong Kong – China

Stages
The race comprises 10 stages, covering 1495.9 kilometres.

Classification leadership

Final standings

General classification

Points classification

Mountains classification

Asian rider classification

Team classification

Asian team classification

Stage results

Stage 1
27 February 2014 — Langkawi(Porto Malai) to Langkawi (Pantai Chenang),

Stage 2
28 February 2014 — Sungai Petani to Taiping,

Stage 3
1 March 2014 — Kampar to Kuala Lumpur,

Stage 4
2 March 2014 — Subang to Genting Highlands,

Stage 5
3 March 2014 — Karak to Rembau,

Stage 6 
4 March 2014 — Melaka to Pontian,

Stage 7
5 March 2014 — Kota Tinggi to Pekan,

Stage 8 
6 March 2014 — Kuantan to Marang,

Stage 9
7 March 2014 — Bandar Permaisuri to Kuala Terengganu,

Stage 10 
8 March 2014 — Tasik Kenyir to Kuala Terengganu,

References

External links
 2014 Tour de Langkawi at cyclingnews.com
 2014 Tour de Langkawi at cyclingarchives.com

Tour de Langkawi
Tour de Langkawi
Tour de Langkawi